Daniel Kasende is a South African rugby union player for the  in the Currie Cup. His regular position is wing or fullback.

Kasende was named in the team for the first round of Super Rugby Unlocked against , making his debut in the process.

References

South African rugby union players
Living people
Rugby union wings
Rugby union fullbacks
Griquas (rugby union) players
Year of birth missing (living people)
Cheetahs (rugby union) players
Free State Cheetahs players